Thomas Tingey Craven (8 July 1873 in Vallejo, California – 5 April 1950 in St. Albans, New York) was a United States naval officer with service in World War I and World War II and rose to the rank of vice admiral.

Biography
He was a son of Henry Smith Craven, a United States Navy officer and engineer and the grandson of his namesake, Thomas Tingey Craven (1808–1887) and great-grandson of Commodore Thomas Tingey (1750–1829). 

Craven graduated from the United States Naval Academy in 1896.  His first assignment after graduation was to the newly commissioned  battleship USS Massachusetts (BB-2), where he served as a naval cadet.  (Prior to the first world war, graduates of the naval academy were required to serve two years at sea prior to being commissioned.)  Craven was commissioned as an ensign on 6 May 1898.  During the Spanish–American War he served on the collier USS Scindia which delivered coal to recently captured Guantanamo Bay in Cuba in June 1898.  He married Antoinette Merritt in 1901. 

In 1908, Craven was stationed aboard the battleship  assigned duties as the ship's gunnery officer. In 1916, Thomas T. Craven was given command of the gunboat  which he commanded throughout World War I until 1918.

In the aftermath of the Honda Point Disaster in September 1923, Admiral Tingey defended Captain Edward H. Watson, Commanding Officer of Destroyer Squadron 11, during the courts martial proceedings.

During the remainder of his naval career, Craven commanded Destroyer Squadron 15, was the Director of Naval Communications, commanded Great Lakes Naval Training Station, the Yangtze Patrol in China, Battleship Division One and served as the Commandant of the Thirteenth Naval District in Bremerton, Washington prior to retiring from active duty in 1937.

Following the United States' entrance into World War II, Vice Admiral Craven was recalled to active duty serving as superintendent of the New York Maritime Academy at Fort Schuyler, NY until 1946, when he was succeeded by Vice Admiral Herbert F. Leary.

References

External links
 
 
 
Thomas Tingey Craven Memoirs, 1897-1953 (bulk 1942-1953), MS 530 held by Special Collections & Archives, Nimitz Library at the United States Naval Academy

1873 births
1950 deaths
United States Navy vice admirals
United States Naval Academy alumni
Naval War College alumni
American military personnel of the Philippine–American War
United States Navy personnel of World War I
United States Navy World War II admirals
Recipients of the Navy Distinguished Service Medal
Military personnel from Vallejo, California